Southwark St Olave was an ancient civil and ecclesiastical parish on the south bank of the River Thames, covering the area around where Shard London Bridge now stands in the modern London Borough of Southwark. The boundaries varied over time but in general the parish stretched east from London Bridge past Tower Bridge to St Saviour's Dock. Southwark St Olave and St Thomas replaced the civil parish in 1896. It was abolished in 1904 and absorbed by Bermondsey parish.

Boundary changes
Southwark St Olave formed part of the ancient Borough of Southwark. Part of its area was split off around 1550 to create Southwark St Thomas, corresponding to the hospital of the Archbishop of Canterbury. In 1733, part of area was used to create Southwark St John Horsleydown.

Administration

The parish became, with St John Horsleydown and St Thomas, part of the St Olave Poor Law Union and in 1855 it became part of the St Olave District of the Metropolis. It was absorbed by the County of London in 1889.

In 1896 St Olave was abolished as a civil parish and was combined again with Southwark St Thomas to form Southwark St Olave and St Thomas. In 1900 the combined parish became part of the Metropolitan Borough of Bermondsey and was abolished in 1904, with its former area absorbed into the Bermondsey civil parish, as was that of St John Horsleydown.

The ecclesiastical parish of St Olave was abolished in 1947, and then formed part of Southwark St Olave and St John.

See also
 Tooley Street is the main thoroughfare of the parish and that article covers much of the secular history of the area

References

History of the London Borough of Southwark
Parishes united into districts (Metropolis)
Former civil parishes in London
Bills of mortality parishes